Shahr Ab or Shahrab or Shehrab or Shohrab may refer to:
 Shahrab, Hamadan
 Shahrab, Isfahan
 Shahrab, Markazi
 Shahrab, Yazd